The ARM Cortex-X2 is a central processing unit implementing the ARMv9-A 64-bit instruction set designed by ARM Holdings' Austin design centre as part of ARM's Cortex-X Custom (CXC) program.

Architecture changes in comparison with ARM Cortex-X1
The processor implements the following changes:

 10 cycle pipeline down from 11, created by reducing the dispatch stage from 2 cycles to 1
 reorder buffer increased by 30% from 224 entries to 288
 dTLB increased by 20% from 40 entries to 48
 SVE2 SIMD support
Bfloat16 data type support
 Support for Aarch32 removed
Comparing the Cortex-X2 with 8MB of L3 cache to the Cortex-X1 with 4MB of L3 cache:
16% greater integer performance
100% greater ML performance

Usage 

 MediaTek Dimensity 9000/9000+
 Qualcomm Snapdragon 7+ Gen 2
 Qualcomm Snapdragon 8/8+ Gen 1
 Samsung Exynos 2200

See also 

 ARM Cortex-A710, related high performance microarchitecture

References 

ARM processors